Riders of the Northland is a 1942 American Western film directed by William Berke and written by Paul Franklin. The film stars Charles Starrett, Russell Hayden, Shirley Patterson, Cliff Edwards, Bobby Larson and Lloyd Bridges. The film was released on June 18, 1942, by Columbia Pictures.

Plot

Cast           
Charles Starrett as Steve Bowie
Russell Hayden as Lucky Laidlaw
Shirley Patterson as Sheila Taylor
Cliff Edwards as Harmony Bumpas
Bobby Larson as Buddy Taylor
Lloyd Bridges as Alex
Kenneth MacDonald as Matt Taylor
Paul Sutton as Chris Larsen
Rudolph Anders as Nazi Agent 
Joe McGuinn as Stacy
Francis Walker as Dobie
George Piltz as Luke

References

External links
 

1942 films
1940s English-language films
American Western (genre) films
1942 Western (genre) films
Columbia Pictures films
Films directed by William A. Berke
American black-and-white films
1940s American films